Warrant Officer 1 may refer to:

 Warrant officer (United States), rank grade W-1 in the United States Military
 Warrant officer (United Kingdom), rank class WO1 in the British Army
 Warrant Officer First Class, a rank in the Royal Canadian Air Cadets